Prince Naif bin Abdulaziz International Airport , formerly Qassim International Airport, is an international airport serving Buraidah, Saudi Arabia. Located in Mulayda outskirt of Buraidah and named after the former Crown Prince Nayef bin Abdulaziz, it primarily serves the northern provinces of the kingdom. International routes are limited to 9 countries: the United Arab Emirates, Egypt, Bahrain, Azerbaijan (seasonal), Bosnia and Herzegovina (seasonal),Qatar, Kuwait,  Pakistan, and Turkey. Established in 1964, the airport is owned and operated by the General Authority of Civil Aviation (GACA). It was renamed to Prince Naif bin Abdulaziz International Airport by royal decree by King Abdullah on 5 July 2012 in memory of former Crown Prince Naif. 

Prince Sultan, then crown prince and minister of defense and aviation, launched an expansion project of the royal terminal at the airport in 2003. GACA has spent more than SR300 million on expansion projects since 1964 and the airport continues to undergo further expansion as it consolidates its position as a main aviation hub in Saudi Arabia's central region.

Airlines and destinations

Statistics

Incidents and accidents

 On 28 May 2005, three military helicopters parked in the airport caught fire, also damaging the buildings next to the hangar. There were no human casualties.

References

External links

1964 establishments in Saudi Arabia
Airports established in 1964
Airports in Saudi Arabia
Al-Qassim Province